The 2014 FIBA Africa Under-18 Championship for Women (alternatively the Afrobasket U18) was the 13th U-18 FIBA Africa championship, played under the auspices of the Fédération Internationale de Basketball, the world basketball sport governing body. The tournament was held from September 19–28 in Cairo, Egypt, contested by 8 national teams and won by Mali.

The tournament qualified the winner and the runner-up for the 2015 FIBA Under-19 World Championship for Women.

Draw

Squads

Preliminary round 
Times given below are in UTC+3.

Group A

Group B

Knockout stage

5-8th classification

Semi-finals

7th place match

5th place match

Bronze medal match

Final

Final standings

Mali rosterAssitan Traore, Astan Soumare, Awa Keita, Christinie Dakouo, Djeneba N'Diaye, Fanta Djire, Hawa Bagayoko, Kadidia Maiga, Kani Keita, Korotoumou Konare, Mariam Coulibaly, Mariam Maiga, Coach: Mohamed Salia

Statistical Leaders

Individual Tournament Highs

Points

Rebounds

Assists

Steals

Blocks

Turnovers

2-point field goal percentage

3-point field goal percentage

Free throw percentage

Individual Game Highs

Team Tournament Highs

Points

Rebounds

Assists

Steals

Blocks

Turnovers

2-point field goal percentage

3-point field goal percentage

Free throw percentage

Team Game highs

Awards

All-Tournament Team

G  Neidy Ocuane
G  Nada Amr
F  Djeneba N'Diaye
F  Raneem Mohamed
C  Mariam Coulibaly

See also
 2013 FIBA Africa Under-16 Championship for Women

References

External links
Official website

2014
2014 in African basketball
2014 in Egyptian sport
International basketball competitions hosted by Egypt
2014 in youth sport
2014 in women's basketball